George Washington Chavis was a state legislator in Mississippi. He served in the Mississippi House of Representatives from Warren County, Mississippi in 1874 and 1875.

He was born in Tennessee. He moved to Illinois after Mississippi banned "free people of color". He returned to Mississippi in the early 1870s.

In 1879 he wrote to Blanche K. Bruce that is it "too late now for much reform" and that he was planning to leave the state because "the old rebs has too much old prenudice that is bound to destroy not only the one that has it but will destroy both soul and body and a nation that will let it rule the government."

His son Jordan Chavis graduated from Alcorn State and became a teacher. He served as a chaplain in the Spanish American War.

See also
African-American officeholders during and following the Reconstruction era

References

Members of the Mississippi House of Representatives
Year of birth missing
Year of death missing